Goodenia coronopifolia is a species of flowering plant in the family Goodeniaceae and is endemic to north-western Australia. It is a herb with mostly linear leaves, those at the base of the plant divided with narrow segments, racemes of yellow flowers with brownish-purple markings, and more or less spherical fruit.

Description

Taxonomy and naming
Goodenia coronopifolia was first formally described in 1810 by Robert Brown in Prodromus Florae Novae Hollandiae et Insulae Van Diemen. The specific epithet (coronopifolia) means "Coronopus-leaved".

Distribution
This goodenia grows in northern parts of the Northern Territory and Western Australia.

Conservation status
Goodenia coerulea is classified as "not threatened" by the Western Australian Government Department of Parks and Wildlife and as of "least concern" under the Northern Territory Government Territory Parks and Wildlife Conservation Act 1976.

References

coronopifolia
Eudicots of Western Australia
Flora of the Northern Territory
Plants described in 1810
Taxa named by Robert Brown (botanist, born 1773)